Panagrolaimus superbus is a species of terrestrial free-living nematode (roundworm). P. superbus, like other species within the Panagrolaimus genus, exhibits the ability to enter anhydrobiosis for extended periods of time.

Ecology
P. superbus is non-parasitic terrestrial bacterivore, commonly found on grasses such as rye. It is found in continental Europe, as well as Surtsey, Iceland.

Metabolism
In order to combat rapid desiccation, P. superbus has several constitutive genes that allow the accumulation of trehalose, even under normal metabolic circumstances, that acts as a protective layer and an intracellular protection mechanism. P. superbus also has several inducible genes that upregulate in response to desiccation, genes responsible for enzymes such as gpx, dj1 and 1 Cys-Prx to help scavenge and reduce reactive oxygen species, mitogen-activated protein kinases that phosphorylate heat shock proteins such as Hsp27 to stabilise microfilaments, and casein kinase 2 that helps in DNA repair, among others. P. superbus's ability to enter anhydriobiosis has given it polyextremotolerance, a tolerance of various extreme environments, being the first multi-cellular organism able to withstand immersion and reproduce in heavy water, albeit with a reduced metabolic rate, withstand immersion in gallium, and tolerate g-forces up to 400,000 times the Earth's.

References

Tylenchida
Animals described in 1930